Ann Spence Black (1861 - 1947) was a Scottish artist known for her landscape and flower paintings.

Biography
Black was born at Dysart in Fife and appears to have been a self-taught artist. Although she lived in Edinburgh for most of her life, there were several other locations in Scotland that she regularly depicted in her paintings. These included the Scottish east coast and the area around Culross. Black was a prolific painter and as well as landscapes also produced richly coloured flower pieces. She was a regular exhibitor with the Royal Scottish Academy between 1896 and 1946. During her career she had some 95 works shown at the Royal Scottish Watercolour Society, RSW, and almost 40 with the Royal Glasgow Institute of the Fine Arts. Black was elected to the RSW in 1917 and to the Society of Scottish Artists in 1940. Works by Black are held in the City of Edinburgh collection, by Kirkcaldy Galleries, by The McManus in Dundee and by the University of St Andrews.

Further reading
 Dictionary of British Women Artists by Sara Gray, 2009, published by The Lutterworth Press

References

1861 births
1947 deaths
19th-century Scottish painters
19th-century Scottish women artists
20th-century Scottish painters
20th-century Scottish women artists
People from Dysart, Fife